The fourth edition of the Indian music television series Coke Studio India, titled as Coke Studio @ MTV, commenced airing on 1 March 2015 and concluded on 4 October 2015. The season returned with the previous year's format of multiple music composers producing their own songs. The season featured 9 music producers. It turned out to be Coke Studio India's last season.

Featured artists

Producers 

 Amit Trivedi
 Anupam Roy
 Dhruv Ghanekar
 Jatinder Shah
 Jeet Gannguli
 Manj Musik
 Ram Sampath
 Sachin–Jigar
 Salim–Sulaiman
 Sunny Brown
 Pradeep Giri

Vocalists 

 Amit Trivedi
 Anupam Roy 
 Babul Supriyo
 Bhanvari Devi
 Bhungarkhan Manganiar
 Bobkat
 Dhruv Ghanekar 
 Diljit Dosanjh 
 Divya Kumar
 Gurdas Maan
 Harshdeep Kaur
 Ila Arun
 Jashan Singh
 Jasmine Sandlas
 Jatinder Shah 
 Jeet Gannguli 
 Jyoti Nooran
 Kalpana Patowary 
 Kirtidan Gadhvi 
 Krishna Kumar Buddha Ram
 Manj Musik 
 Master Saleem
 Raftaar (rapper) 
 Raj Pandit
 Rajesh Radhakrishnan
 Ram Sampath 
 Rekha Bhardwaj 
 Rituraj Mohanty
 Sachin–Jigar
 Salim Merchant 
 Satyaki Banerjee 
 Shadab Faridi 
 Sharmilee Supriyo 
 Sona Mohapatra 
 Sonia Saigal
 Sukhwinder Singh
 Sunny Brown 
 Taniskha Sanghvi
 Tochi Raina
 Tony Sebastian
 Vidya Harikrishna
 Viveick Rajgopalan

Episodes 
Coke Studio India 4 began airing on 1 March 2015 and concluded on 4 October 2015. The season featured 6 episodes, a total of 17 songs, released in the span of six months.

Notes and references

Notes

References

External links 
 

2015 Indian television series debuts
Indian television series
Coke Studio (Indian TV program)